Fatime Sokoli (18 June 1948 – 12 August 1987) was an Albanian 20th century folk music singer.

References

External links

20th-century Albanian women singers
Albanian folk musicians
1987 deaths
1948 births
People from Tropojë